Stephen Lavin is a dual player from Co. Limerick. He has played with the Limerick  team men's during the 2000s.

He won a Railway Cup with Munster in 2008.

References
 Lavin gets Limerick hurling call-up
 Adare force replay

Living people
Adare hurlers
Limerick inter-county hurlers
Adare Gaelic footballers
Limerick inter-county Gaelic footballers
American Gaelic footballers
American hurlers
Dual players
Year of birth missing (living people)